Markey may refer to:

People 

 Alexander Markey (1891–1958), a Hungarian-born American film-maker 
 Betsy Markey (born 1956), former Democratic U. S. Representative representing Colorado's 4th congressional district
 Brendan Markey (born 1976), Irish soccer player
 Dave Markey (born 1963), American film director
 Ed Markey (born 1946), U. S. senator and former U.S. Representative from Massachusetts, 
 Enda Markey (born 1976), Irish stage and television actor 
 Enid Markey (1894–1981), American actress most famous for originating the role of Jane in Tarzan films
 Gene Markey (1895–1980), American author, producer, screenwriter, and decorated naval officer
 John Markey, former head coach of the University of Maryland college football program
 Howard Thomas Markey (1920–2006), first chief judge of the United States Court of Appeals for the Federal Circuit
 Margaret Markey, member of New York State Assembly representing District 30
 Mary Jo Markey, American film and television editor

Places 

 Markey Township, Michigan

See also
 Markee (disambiguation)
 Marky (disambiguation), various people
 DJ Marky, Brazilian DJ
 Marquee (disambiguation)